Gregory Crewdson (born September 26, 1962) is an American photographer. He photographs tableaux of American homes and neighborhoods.

Early life and education

Crewdson was born in the Park Slope neighborhood of Brooklyn, New York. He attended John Dewey High School.

As a teenager, he was part of a power pop group called The Speedies that hit the New York scene. Their song, "Let Me Take Your Photo" proved to be prophetic to Crewdson's future career. In 2005, Hewlett Packard used the song in advertisements to promote its digital cameras.

At Purchase College, State University of New York, he enrolled in a Photo 101 class taught by Laurie Simmons to impress a crush, and fell in love with the medium. He went on to study with Jan Groover before graduating. He then received his MFA in Photography at the Yale School of Art.

Life and work
Crewdson is professor and director of graduate studies in Photography at Yale School of Art.

In 2012, he was the subject of the feature documentary film Gregory Crewdson: Brief Encounters. The film series followed the construction and the behind-the-scenes explanation from Crewdson himself of his thought process and vision for his pieces of his collection Beneath the Roses.

He is represented by Gagosian Gallery.

Style

Crewdson's photographs are elaborately staged and lit using crews familiar with motion picture production and lighting large scenes using motion picture film equipment and techniques. Using shots that resemble film productions, Crewdson deconstructs American suburban life in his work. He has cited the films Vertigo, The Night of the Hunter, Close Encounters of the Third Kind, Blue Velvet, and Safe as having influenced his style, as well as the painter Edward Hopper and photographer Diane Arbus.

Crewdson's most widely-known bodies of work include Twilight (1998–2002), Beneath the Roses (2003–2008), Cathedral of the Pines (2013–2014) and An Eclipse of Moths. He works much like a director with a budget similar to that of a small movie production, each image involves dozens of people and weeks to months of planning.

Crewdson's only body of work made outside of the U.S. was Sanctuary (2009), set at the abandoned Cinecittá studios outside of Rome. Nearly all of his other work before and since was made in the small towns and cities in Western Massachusetts.

Personal life
He has two children, Lily and Walker, with his ex-wife Ivy Shapiro.

Publications
 Hover. Artspace Books, 1995. .
 Twilight: Photographs by Gregory Crewdson. Harry N. Abrams, 2002. . With an essay by Rick Moody.
 Gregory Crewdson: 1985–2005. Hatje Cantz, 2005. .
 Gregory Crewdson: Fireflies. Skarstedt Fine Art, 2007. .
 Beneath the Roses. With Russell Banks. Harry N. Abrams, 2008. .
 Sanctuary. With Anthony O. Scott. Hatje Cantz, 2010. .
 In a Lonely Place. Hatje Cantz, 2011. .
 Gregory Crewdson. New York: Rizzoli, 2013. .
 Cathedral of the Pines. New York: Aperture, 2016. . With a text by Alexander Nemerov.

Exhibitions
 Yale University Art Gallery, New Haven, CT, 1988
 BlumHelman Warehouse, New York; and traveled to Portland School of Art, Portland, Maine; Ruth Bloom Gallery, Los Angeles, CA, 1991
 Houston Center for Photography, Houston, TX, 1992
 Feigen Gallery, Chicago, IL, 1993
 Palm Beach Community College Museum of Art, Palm Beach, FL, 1994
 Galleri Charlotte Lund, Stockholm, Sweden, 1995
 Les Images du Plaisir, Frac des Pays de la Loire, Galerie des Carmes, La Flèche, France, 1995
 Jay Jopling / White Cube, London, 1995
 Ginza Artspace, Shiseido Co., Tokyo, 1996
 Cleveland Center for Contemporary Art, Cleveland, OH, 1997
 Espacio Uno, Museo Nacional Centro de Arte Reina Sofía, Madrid, Spain, 1998; and traveled to Salamanca, 1999
 Rudofinium Gallery, Prague, Czech Republic, 2008
 Duane Hanson/Gregory Crewdson: Uncanny realities, Museum Frieder Burda, Baden-Baden, Germany, 2010–2011
 Kulturhuset, Stockholm, Sweden, 2011
 Gregory Crewdson: In a Lonely Place, C/O Berlin, Berlin, 2011; and traveled to Det Kongelige Bibliotek, Copenhagen, Denmark, 2011/2012)
Cathedral of the Pines, Gagosian Gallery, New York, NY, 2016; The Photographers' Gallery, London, 2017.
The Becket Pictures, FRAC Auvergne, Clermont-Ferrand, France, 2017.
Gregory Crewdson: Eveningside, Gallerie d’Italia, Turin, Italy, October 12, 2022–January 22, 2023
https://gallerieditalia.com/it/torino/mostre-e-iniziative/mostre/2022/10/12/gregory-crewdson-eveningside-en/

Awards
Skowhegan Medal for Photography
National Endowment for the Arts fellowship

Collections
Crewdson's work is held in the following permanent collections:
Metropolitan Museum of Art, New York: 7 prints (as of 14 January 2023)
Solomon R. Guggenheim Museum, New York: 3 prints (as of 14 January 2023)
Whitney Museum, New York: 18 prints (as of 14 January 2023)

References

Fine art photographers
1962 births
Living people
Photographers from New York (state)
Artists from New York City
State University of New York at Purchase alumni
Yale School of Art alumni
People from Park Slope
John Dewey High School alumni
20th-century American photographers
21st-century American photographers
Brooklyn Friends School alumni